Kindimba is a village in Mbinga district in the Ruvuma Region of the Tanzanian Southern Highlands. It is the historical centre of the Matengo Highlands and of the Matengo people.

References

Populated places in Ruvuma Region